Nadine Ivanitzky (1874-28 March 1919) was a Ukrainian sociologist who specialized in research on primitive people. After earning a degree from the University of Geneva, she attended courses at the Sorbonne and earned a doctorate from the Free University of Brussels. Her doctoral advisor was Emile Waxweiler, who hired her as one of the ten permanent researchers at the Solvay Institute of Sociology. She was in charge of  cultural anthropological research at the institute and became a specialist in studying pre-industrial cultures.

Early life and education
Nadine Ivanitzky was born in 1874 in Kharkiv, in the Kharkov Governorate, of the Russian Empire. She was the next to last child in a family of eleven, who lived on an ancestral estate in Kharkiv. Ivanitzky earned a teaching diploma from the normal school in Kharkiv and at the age of eighteen moved to Geneva, Switzerland to continue her education. She studied at the University of Geneva from 1896 to 1899, earning a degree in social sciences. Leaving Switzerland, Ivanitzky took courses at the Sorbonne with Alphonse Aulard, Henri Bergson, Émile Durkheim, and Ernest Lavisse for several years. Her doctoral supervisor was Emile Waxweiler and her thesis was entitled "Les élites sociales" ("The Social Elites").

Career
After completing her doctorate, Ivanitzky was hired as one of the ten researchers at the Solvay Institute of Sociology. The Institute of Social Sciences had been founded by chemist and industrialist Ernest Solvay in 1894 to study the socio-political development of human productivity. In 1902, it became the Institute of Sociology under the direction of Waxweiler. Waxweiler's focus was on providing researchers with access to materials and facilities where they could study and share information, which analyzed structural functionalism to determine how social relationships were created or dissolved. Ivanitzky was placed in charge of the cultural anthropological research at the institute. She became a specialist in evaluating the evolution of primitive societies, publishing numerous papers in the Bulletin de l'Institut de Sociologie Solvay.  She studied Native American, Asian, African, and Pacific societies attempting to learn how over time habits and customs became codified into rules and organizational structures. At the time, indigenous societies were assumed to be "dying races" and artists, photographers, scientists, and writers were anxious to document them before they vanished. These works created wide public interest in the native inhabitants of other continents and concern that contact with Europeans would lead to their demise. From government perspectives, these types of studies justified racial policies that supported segregation, cultural assimilation, and restriction of the rights of native peoples.

In 1914, Ivanitzky was visiting in Ghent when German troops invaded. Unable to obtain travel documents as a foreigner, she posed as a Belgian friend and managed to escape to England. Making her way to London, she continued with her work at the British Museum and the Royal Anthropological Institute of Great Britain and Ireland. She also volunteered with the Red Cross. Because her trip to Britain was unplanned, Ivanitzky had left most of her work behind in Belgium. She was in the midst of evaluating racial issues in society. In 1917, along with Fernand Van Langenhove, she paid homage to Waxweiler's contributions to sociology in "La doctrine sociologique d'Émile Waxweiler", after his sudden death in 1916.

Ivanitzky's papers were collected by friends in London, who after some delay returned them to the Solvay Institute. S.-A. Deschamps and Georges Smets combined her Belgian and British notes and posthumously published her article "Les institutions des primitifs Australiens" ("The Institutions of Primitive Australians") in 1922. The work was covered in both scientific journals and popular newspapers, like Le Figaro in Paris and La Presse in Montreal. Ethnologist Guillaume Grandidier summarized her paper noting that although different from western societies, Aboriginal Australian societies respected specific territories of other aboriginal groups which were exploited for subsistence hunting and gathering. In areas in which they had not encountered Europeans, Aboriginal cultures were able to thrive, but in areas dominated by Europeans, disease and destruction of their traditional way of life was a threat. Rather than organized governance, Aboriginal societies relied on the guidance of elders and their traditions of distribution to care for the community. Sociologist Achille Ouy noted that she delineated marriage customs and methods of population control, including infanticide, used to regulate community size so that resources could sustain the population. He stated that her work was meticulously documented and was described in exacting detail, and was an "excellente monograph" (excellent monograph).

Death and legacy
Ivanitzky died on 28 March 1919 in London from the influenza pandemic which followed the end of World War I. Her work continued to be cited by researchers throughout the 20th century, although later scholars recognized that the early ideas that pre-industrial societies were inferior have been discarded. She was included in 21st-century scholarship on the composition of the student body of the University of Brussels, undertaken to study the foreign students who attended the university.

Selected works

References

Citations

Bibliography

 

1874 births
1919 deaths
University of Geneva alumni
University of Paris alumni
Vrije Universiteit Brussel alumni
Ukrainian academics
Ukrainian sociologists
People from Kharkiv
Emigrants from the Russian Empire to Switzerland